GRAM domain-containing 2A protein (GRAMD2A; formerly GRAMD2) is a protein encoded by the GRAMD2A gene.  Like GRAMD2B, the protein consists of a GRAM domain and a transmembrane domain that anchors it to the endoplasmic reticulum.

GRAMD2A is a mammalian representative of the yeast lipid transfer proteins anchored at a membrane contact site (LAM) family.  It has four paralogs: GRAMD1A, GRAMD1B, GRAMD1C and GRAMD2B.  Unlike LAM and its paralogs except GRAMD2B, GRAMD2A lacks a VASt domain.

The protein localizes to sites where membranes from different organelles are in close apposition.  There, it tethers the endoplasmic reticulum to the plasma membrane through its GRAM domain binding phosphatidylinositol 4,5-bisphosphate in the plasma membrane at sites enriched for the phospholipid.  The protein ensures proper stromal interaction molecule 1 (STIM1) recruitment to these sites of membrane contact as part of the store-operated calcium entry pathway – a component of intracellular calcium homeostasis.

References